The 1940–41 season in Swedish football, starting August 1940 and ending July 1941:

Honours

Official titles

Competitions

Promotions, relegations and qualifications

Promotions

Relegations

Domestic results

Allsvenskan 1940–41

Allsvenskan promotion play-off 1940–41

Division 2 Norra 1940–41

Division 2 Östra 1940–41

Division 2 Västra 1940–41

Division 2 Södra 1940–41

Division 2 promotion play-off 1940–41

Norrländska Mästerskapet 1941 
Final

National team results 

 Sweden: 

 Sweden: 

 Sweden: 

 Sweden:

National team players in season 1940/41

Notes

References 
Print

Online

 
Seasons in Swedish football